Girish Park is a neighbourhood of North Kolkata in Kolkata district in the Indian state of West Bengal. it is named after famous Bengali Theatre personnel Girish Chandra Ghosh.

Geography

Police district
Girish Park police station is part of the Central division of Kolkata Police. It is located at 138, Ram Dulal Sarkar Street, Kolkata-700006.

Taltala Women police station covers all police districts under the jurisdiction of the Central division, i.e. Bowbazar, Burrabazar, Girish Park, Hare Street, Jorasanko, Muchipara, New Market, Taltala and Posta.

Flyover collapse
In the Vivekananda flyover collapse, when a portion of the under-construction flyover collapsed in the Girish Park neighbourhood on 31 March 2016, 81 persons were killed and 205 injured.

Transport

Road
Girish Park is the junction of Chittaranjan Avenue and Vivekananda Road. Beadon Street (Dani Ghosh Sarani/Abhedananda Road) also intersects Chittaranjan Avenue nearby. Many buses ply along these roads.

Train
Burra Bazar railway station and Sealdah Station are the nearest railway stations.

References

External links
 

Neighbourhoods in Kolkata